The following is a list of the 256 communes of the Creuse department of France.

The communes cooperate in the following intercommunalities (as of 2020):
Communauté d'agglomération du Grand Guéret
Communauté de communes de Bénévent-Grand-Bourg
Communauté de communes Creuse Confluence
Communauté de communes Creuse Grand Sud
Communauté de communes Creuse Sud Ouest
Haute-Corrèze Communauté (partly)
Communauté de communes Marche et Combraille en Aquitaine
Communauté de communes du Pays Dunois
Communauté de communes du Pays Sostranien
Communauté de communes Portes de la Creuse en Marche

References

Lists of communes of France